The Polyphonic Spree is an American choral rock band from Dallas, Texas that was formed in 2000 by singer/songwriter Tim DeLaughter. The band's pop and rock songs are augmented by a large vocal choir, and instruments such as flute, trumpet, french horn, trombone, violin, viola, cello, percussion, piano, guitars, bass, drums, electronic keyboards, and EWI.

History
DeLaughter's previous group, Tripping Daisy, came to an abrupt end in 1999 when guitarist Wes Berggren died of a drug overdose. The Polyphonic Spree was formed, in part, in reaction to Berggren's death.

In 2000, DeLaughter collaborated with 12 other musicians to put together a sound that reflected the music he grew up with. He wanted to explore the orchestral palette and pop sensibility of The Beatles, The Association, The 5th Dimension, Wings, Electric Light Orchestra and The Beach Boys and the vocal style of Ozzy Osbourne from Black Sabbath. Within two weeks, The Polyphonic Spree created a 30-minute set, donned their signature white choir robes and performed with Grandaddy and Bright Eyes.

Shortly after their first show, 12 more musicians joined the band, and they recorded The Beginning Stages of ... The Polyphonic Spree, which contained all nine songs (sections) written for their first show plus a tenth track ("Section 10 – Long Day"). The album was intended to serve as a demo recording for booking the band for live performances. As a result of the attention they received from the press and other industry pundits after performing at the South by Southwest music festival in Austin, Texas, the band was invited to perform at London's Meltdown Festival curated by David Bowie in 2002. They opened for The Divine Comedy at the Royal Festival Hall the same year.

In early 2003, they were dropped by their record label, 679 Recordings, for "lack of record sales". About this time, the band began to break into pop culture. The song "Light and Day" was used in a joint Volkswagen Beetle/iPod tie-in advertising campaign, appearing on television commercials nationwide in 2004. The same song was used in a tribute to Bill Walsh during an NFL football preseason special, in an episode of the TV series Scrubs, in Murderball, a documentary about the U.S. wheelchair rugby team, and as the end music for the first series of the BBC Radio 7 sci-fi comedy Undone; the song's video was adapted for the movie Eternal Sunshine of the Spotless Mind (the DVD features a clip). Also during this time the band was invited to be an opening act for Bowie's Reality Tour and again performed at South by Southwest.

In 2004, Hollywood Records released the Spree's second album, Together We're Heavy, in Japan on June 30, Europe on July 12, and North America on July 13, 2004. The band was featured on Scrubs on April 20, 2004, in the episode "My Choosiest Choice of All" (season 3, episode 19); and on the TV show Las Vegas on November 29, 2004, in the episode "Silver Star" (season 2, episode 10). In December 2004, the Polyphonic Spree performed at the Nobel Peace Prize Concert, honoring Wangari Maathai before a worldwide television audience.

2005 saw the release of Thumbsucker, a feature film by Mike Mills, with a score composed by Tim DeLaughter and performed by The Polyphonic Spree.

On June 19, 2007, the band released their third complete album, The Fragile Army, produced by John Congleton. On their 2007 tours The Polyphonic Spree replaced their robes with black army outfits while continuing to don the robes during encores. In July 2007, the song "Running Away" was featured on the Sci-Fi network in commercials for its upcoming season. In the autumn of 2007, Adidas commissioned artists to write theme songs for MLS teams as part of a campaign called "MLS Represent", and the Polyphonic Spree was chosen to write a song for FC Dallas. The result was the song "H-O-O-P-S Yes!" In September 2007, the Polyphonic Spree performed three songs: "Light and Day / Reach for the Sun", "Soldier Girl", and "Light to Follow", at Oscar de la Renta's Spring 2008 Fashion Show for New York Fashion Week. They recorded the opening track to the Showtime series Weeds for season 2 (episode 9), and also contributed to the Hedwig and the Angry Inch and Nightmare Before Christmas tribute CDs. UK channel Sky Sports used "Running Away" to advertise their spring and summer cricket coverage. UK supermarket Sainsbury's continues to use "Light and Day / Reach for the Sun" for its advertising campaign. It became the most-used song in advertising in the United Kingdom.

In 2009, the band wrote and performed the opening sequence to Showtime's new show The United States of Tara, which stars Toni Collette as a woman with multiple personality disorder. They first performed the song live on their Australian tour, in Adelaide. "Light and Day / Reach for the Sun" was also featured on the "Your UQ" advertising campaign for the University of Queensland.

On July 11, 2011, the band released Bullseye, an interactive music video app for iOS devices featuring the first single from a collection of songs.

"Light and Day / Reach for the Sun" was featured in the movie trailer for the 2012 animated film The Lorax. On October 11, 2012, the band launched a Kickstarter campaign to fund their next studio album, tour, live album, and concert DVD. They reached their funding goal of $100,000 on November 28. The band's Holidaydream: Sounds of the Holidays, Vol. One was released in 2012, featuring an original introduction, outro and Polyphonic Spree cover versions of classic Christmas songs including "Happy Xmas (War Is Over)" and "Let it Snow".

On August 6, 2013, the band played a sold-out concert at London's Village Underground to mark the release of their album Yes, It's True. The performance was broadcast live on Vimeo. A US release show at the Granada Theater in Dallas followed on August 9, and the band toured in support of the album worldwide. A live DVD was released in October 2013, and the band played their famous Holiday Extravaganza in Dallas, Texas on December 21.

In 2014 the band released the studio album Psychphonic.

The Polyphonic Spree headlined the 2015 Big D NYE party, December 31, 2014, at Dallas's Victory Park at the American Airlines Center. The free outdoor concert was attended by a crowd of over 40,000, who gathered for the annual New Year's Eve event. Perhaps because of the 35 °F weather, the choir wore matching winter ponchos, while other musicians wore pajamas. DeLaughter's headgear resembled a Fred Flintstone Grand Poobah lodge hat (tall fur with buffalo horns). Covers included Wings' "Band on the Run" and the Thunderclap Newman hit "Something in the Air". The band occasionally paused to sync with television cues, as the concert was broadcast live to a regional television audience of over 12 million in Texas and surrounding states.

The band’s latest album, Afflatus, was released on April 16, 2021.

Discography

Studio albums

EPs
Soldier Girl (2002) #4 UK (Budget Albums)
Light & Day (2003)
Wait EP (2006)
We Hope It Finds You Well (2020)

Singles

Live CDs/DVDs
Live From Austin, TX: The Polyphonic Spree (2004)
Coachella (2006)
SXSW Live 2007 DVD (2007)
You + Me - Live in NYC (2013)

Film soundtracks
Eternal Sunshine of the Spotless Mind (2004)
Scrubs (2004)
Thumbsucker (2005)
Mozart and the Whale (2005)
Murderball (2005)
The Best Man (2005)
Keeping Up with the Steins (2006)
Visioneers (2008)
 The Lorax (2012)
The Big Short (2015)
Everything Everywhere All at Once (2022)

Other
Wig in a Box, "Wig in a Box" (2003)
Follow My Voice: With the Music of Hedwig DVD (2006)
Nightmare Revisited, "Town Meeting Song" (2008)

Notes

Members
Current members

Past members (incomplete listing)

References

External links

American pop music groups
Hollywood Records artists
TVT Records artists
Musical groups established in 2000
Musical collectives
Musical groups from Dallas
Musical groups from Denton, Texas
Psychedelic pop music groups
Psychedelic rock music groups from Texas
Rock music groups from Texas
Cherry Red Records artists
679 Artists artists